Walter Brooks may refer to:
 Walter Brooks (organist) (1832–1907), English professor of music and organist
 Walter R. Brooks (1886–1958), American writer 
 Walter Brooks (cricketer) (1884–1965), English cricketer and British Army officer